Samakal ( samakal, "current time, contemporary") is a Bengali-language daily newspaper published in Dhaka, Bangladesh. Samakal started publishing on 31 May 2005. As of 2007, the circulation of Samakal is around 200,000.

Golam Sarwar; is the founder editor of Samakal. Muzzammil Husain is now serving as the editor.

Regular columnists
Noted columnists are regularly writing for this newspaper. Abdul Gaffar Chowdhury contributes here every week in `Kaler Ayna (The Mirror of the Time)'. Hasan Azizul Huq, the famous story writer of the subcontinent, is another columnist for the newspaper. Zillur Rahman Siddiqui, Shahriar Kabir, Badruddin Omar, Economist Anu Muhammad, Abu Ahmed, and Dramatist Mamunur Rashid also write for the vernacular daily.

Supplements
`Kaler Kheya (Boat of the Time)', the most popular literary magazine of present era, is one of the weekly supplements of Samakal. The other weekly supplements are 'Nandan', `Shaili', 'Taka Aana Pai (Economy)', 'Techline', 'Alor Pathojatri', 'Moncharbaire' and 'Ghassfaring (page for children)'. 'Suhreed Samabesh (Platform of Well-wishers)' is the reader organization of this daily.

Business Development, Events and Branding
The newspaper has Business Development, event management and promotion department. Various social, cultural, branding and promotional events, round table conferences, seminars, television programs and many more are being held under the supervision of this section. Alternative Business, Content and Digital Marketing is supervised under this department. Mr Imran Kadir heads this section.

Threats 
From beginning the journey in 2005, the newspaper's journalists have been working despite threats and dangers. In 2005, Goutam Das, who worked as the bureau chief in Faridpur was murdered. In 2006, ruling party cadres attacked Rajshahi bureau office of Samakal and assaulted its bureau chief.

See also
 List of newspapers in Bangladesh
 Prothom Alo
 The Daily Ittefaq
 Jugantor
 Daily Naya Diganta
 The Daily Star

References

External links
 Official website
All Bangla Newspaper

Bengali-language newspapers published in Bangladesh
Daily newspapers published in Bangladesh
Newspapers published in Dhaka
2005 establishments in Bangladesh